"Sexy Eyes" is a song by Dr. Hook, released as a single in early 1980. It was the second of three singles from their LP Sometimes You Win.

In the United States, the single reached No. 5 on the Billboard Hot 100, tying it with "Sylvia's Mother" as the highest-charting song for the band, and was certified Gold by the RIAA.  It was also a Top 10 hit in Canada (#8) and the United Kingdom (#4), in the process becoming the band's last top thirty hit in the UK.

Chart performance

Weekly charts

Year-end charts

Cover versions
Swedish singer Siv-Inger (Siw Inger) published a German cover of the song in 1980. German entertainer Bürger Lars Dietrich covered the song in 1996 under the title "Sexy Eis".

References

1979 songs
1980 singles
Dr. Hook & the Medicine Show songs
Number-one singles in New Zealand
Song recordings produced by Ron Haffkine
Songs written by Keith Stegall
Songs written by Chris Waters
Capitol Records singles